Samuel Reid (born 1 December 1963) is the founding keyboardist with the Canadian rock band, Glass Tiger. He and his band were honoured with five Canadian Music Industry Juno Awards, multiple Canadian SOCAN Classic Awards and were nominated for a Best New Artist Grammy Award.

Career achievements
Juno Awards
1989 Glass Tiger  Canadian Entertainer of the Year
1987 Glass Tiger  Single of the Year – "Someday"
1986 Glass Tiger  Album of the Year-The Thin Red Line
1986 Glass Tiger  Single of the Year – "Don't Forget Me"
1986 Glass Tiger  Most Promising Group of the Year
1986 Glass Tiger  American Grammy Nomination – Best New Artist

Gold & Platinum Records
-Nearly every Glass Tiger record went Gold or Platinum

Discography

with Glass Tiger
 The Thin Red Line (1986)
 Diamond Sun (1988)
 Simple Mission (1991)
 31 (2018)

with Rik Emmett
 The Spirit of Christmas (1999)

References

External links
Willow Music website

1963 births
Living people
Canadian songwriters
Glass Tiger members
Musicians from Brampton
Canadian people of Irish descent